Eagle Works or Eagleworks or variation may refer to:

 Eagleworks Laboratories, also known as Advanced Propulsion Physics Laboratory, a small research group investigating a variety of theories regarding new forms of spacecraft propulsion at NASA's Johnson Space Center 
 Eagle Salt Works Railroad, a defunct railway near Fernley, Nevada, United States
 Eagle Borax Works, a defunct borate mine in Death Valley, California, United States
 Eagle Ironworks, Oxford, United Kingdom

See also
 Eagle (disambiguation)
 Eagle Ironworks (disambiguation)